Tioxazafen [ISO] is a seed treatment nematicide developed by Monsanto to provide consistent broad-spectrum control of nematodes in corn, soy, and cotton. Its structure has a disubstituted oxadiazole skeleton, representing a new class of nematicides. Greenhouse and field trials suggest that it is at least as effective as existing commercial nematicides for the control of soybean cyst nematode, root-knot nematode, and reniform nematode.

Tioxazafen is marketed commercially as Nemastrike.

References

Oxadiazoles
Thiophenes
Nematicides